Mid valley or Midvalley may refer to:

Malaysia
Mid Valley City, a mixed development project in Kuala Lumpur
Mid Valley Komuter station, a commuter train station in Seputeh, Kuala Lumpur
Mid Valley Link, a major highway in Kuala Lumpur
Mid Valley Megamall, a mall in Kuala Lumpur

Other uses
Mid-Valley (Oregon), an area in the Willamette Valley, Oregon, U.S.
Mid Valley Airport, Weslaco, Texas
Mid Valley Shopping Centre, a shopping centre in Morwell, Australia
Mid Valley School District, a public school in Pennsylvania, U.S.

See also